Fort Steele is a heritage site in the East Kootenay region of southeastern British Columbia. This visitor attraction lies on the east shore of the Kootenay River between the mouths of the St. Mary River and Wild Horse River.

Ferry and bridges
In 1864, John Galbraith arrived to prospect for gold on Wild Horse Creek but soon switched to more lucrative business opportunities. Later that year, he was granted a charter for a toll ferry across the Kootenay River, commencing in the new year. John also established a general store, which with the ferry, greatly profited from the early goldfield traffic to the Fisherville mining camp. He sent for two of his brothers and his two sisters with their families. Marrying Sarah Larue, John, and his brother Robert Galbraith (known as R.L.T.), purchased land at Joseph's Prairie (later called Cranbrook), where John operated a ranch from 1867.

The ferry charter was renewed in 1871, 1876, 1880, and 1882. The ferry could carry livestock, but did not appear to have the capacity for a wagon. The annual ferry licence, which was initially $500, was lowered to $200 by 1867, because most miners had abandoned the creek for brighter prospects. In 1874, Robert Galbraith took over the operation, which continued until replaced in l888 by a lift span bridge. The 1894 flood destroyed this  structure, which was superseded by Howe truss approaches and an opening span. The 1909 bridge had three spans, the western one being a Howe truss. The 1934 bridge comprised three Howe trusses. When the highway was realigned in 1966, a concrete span was chosen.

Name origin
Once the crossing became known as Galbraith's Ferry, the place assumed the same name. In 1887, Superintendent Sam Steele arrived with a detachment of the NWMP to defuse tensions between settlers and local First Nations. No actual fort existed, but the police compound, erected that year, had the appearance of a fort, because of the few windows. Four constables did not survive the typhoid that struck the contingent. In 1888, the community adopted the rename of Fort Steele.

Waterway and roads

Early supplies came in by pack train from Walla Walla, Washington. A wagon road northward to Canal Flats opened in 1886. In summertime, the Golden–Fort Steele passenger service encompassed riverboat, tramway and stage modes.

In 1895, a wagon road to the Elk River was completed, providing a link with Montana. By the late 1890s, two riverboat companies served the Jennings, Montana–Fort Steele run. From 1898, a jitney service connected with the Eager train station.

The highway, which followed Main St, was diverted to the present position in 1965.

Community
In 1864, the population numbered over 3,000, but five years later, few remained, except the numerous mosquitos in summer. By July 1888, the NWMP had been reassigned to Fort Macleod and the detachment buildings abandoned. The settlers, who numbered about 11 Caucasians and 60 Chinese, occupied the few buildings by the river. Chas. Clark was the inaugural postmaster 1888–1897.

In 1892, the commercial centre comprised the government buildings, a hotel, and two stores.

In 1894, the townsite was surveyed, Miss Adelaide Bailey became the inaugural teacher, and two hotels were erected. By 1895, Fort Steele was developing into a mining centre. That year, a mining association formed, and the Prospector, the local newspaper, was founded. The infrastructure included two general stores, three hotels, and a sawmill.

In 1897, an annex was added to the Dalgardno Hotel, five further hotels were opened, and the Government Building was erected. On the ground floor were three cells and a courtroom, while upstairs were several offices. Also opened were a hospital, opera house (which soon became a men's club), and a Roman Catholic church. Across the river, warehouses and a bottling plant sprang up. Several new business premises were added to the town, which joined the US telegraph network. A Board of Trade was established. During the first six months of that year, the population grew from about 300 to 3,000.

In 1898, a  water tank was placed atop a  tower, water mains were installed, a volunteer fire department was founded, and a Presbyterian church erected. When the railway bypassed the town, the exodus of residents began. The Anglicans bought a surplus school building for a church. Henry Kershaw opened a general store and ice cream parlour. In 1899, W.A. Prest established a photo studio.

In 1900, the men's club built their own clubhouse, and the opera house became the Masonic Lodge. By 1901, businesses were relocating to Cranbrook or Fernie. Cranbrook acquired the government offices in 1904 and the newspaper in 1905. The town was unable to meet the cost of filling the water tank. Lacking this fire protection resource, most of the business section burned to the ground in the December 1906 blaze.

The town soldiered on for decades. The hospital, now a private residence, likely experienced a brief existence beyond the death of Dr. Hugh Watt in 1914. The school closed in 1954, the Windsor Hotel in 1958, the general store in 1961, and the post office in 1997.

CP Railway
Robert Galbraith, who owned much of the land around Fort Steele, sold a key part of his Joseph's Prairie holdings to Colonel James Baker in 1885.

The B.C. Southern was a Canadian Pacific Railway (CP) subsidiary. In constructing westward from the Crowsnest Pass, many assumed that Fort Steele, the only suitable place of any substance, would be the divisional point. The simple story was that Colonel James Baker willingly gave CP every second townsite lot and the railyard land from his Joseph's Prairie property, knowing he would profit from the development of Cranbrook. Robert Galbraith refused to make a similar concession for a line passing though Fort Steele. The deeper story is that a syndicate, which included Baker and Galbraith, acquired land from them at both locations. By the mid-1890s, the public believed the railway would pass through each location, which increased buyer demand for subdivision lots. In 1898, the railway track crossed the Kootenay River at Wardner, bypassing Fort Steele on the way to Cranbrook.

The Kootenay Central Railway (KCR) was a CP subsidiary. The northward advance of the rail head from Colvalli was near Fort Steele in August 1914. That November, the last spike was driven near the north end of Columbia Lake. Through train service commenced in January 1915.

In 1931, the twice weekly service was reduced to once weekly.

In the early 1970s, the creation of the Lake Koocanusa reservoir behind the Libby Dam necessitated the removal of the Wardner bridge and rerouting the respective track across the Kootenay on the replacement rail bridge built in 1970 at Fort Steele.

Heritage site

Overview

Being the first NWMP post in BC, Fort Steele was designated a National Historic Site of Canada in 1925. In 1961, the province acquired the site to be a historic park. In 1981, the government released a concept plan. In 1972, the Queen, Prince Phillip, and Princess Anne visited the park. In 2004, the non-profit Friends of Fort Steele Society took over full management.

Authentic Fort Steele buildings, some of which were moved to within the present site, include the schoolhouse, two churches, the Opera House, and Windsor hotel. The site includes some reconstructed replicas, smaller buildings salvaged from the region, a selection of early machinery, and railway artifacts. Actors wander the town in period costumes. The Wildhorse Theatre stages live productions. Visitors can have their images captured in old-time brownish tones at the photo studio, practise gold panning, take horse-drawn rides, and watch demonstrations, such as blacksmithing. Meals are available in the International Hotel restaurant and snacks at the City Bakery.

Railway
During summer, steam train rides are offered on a  return journey, with a short stop at the "St. Mary's look-out".

The locomotive fleet has included:

 A Pacific Coast Shay locomotive ("115") built for logging operations on Vancouver Island. The 115 is unusual because it was constructed out of two damaged shays. The 115 is currently the largest shay class locomotive in Canada. Owing to major issues with the boiler, the 115 is not in operation.
 A 2-6-2 prairie class locomotive ("1077") built in 1923 for logging work on Vancouver Island. The 1077 is the main locomotive used at the fort. The 1077 was retired by its owner in the early 1960s, making it one of the last steam locomotives in active service in Canada. After being sold to the B.C government, The 1077 was rebuilt and used as a rolling museum train until it was put into storage in 1979. The 1077 was moved to Fort Steele in 1989 to replace the 115 Shay. The 1077 has featured in several movies, including The Grey Fox, The Journey of Natty Gann, and Shanghai Noon.
 A 0-4-4 type "Dunrobin" ("397") was built in 1895 for private use by the Duke of Sutherland. In 1909, the duke bought new coach 58A. The locomotive was seconded for defence work in Scotland during both world wars. In 1965, a Victoria business man purchased both items, which he sold to the BC government the following year. Arriving at the historic park in 1967, the pair were used for train rides. In 2011, the Beamish Museum, in County Durham, purchased, transported, and rehabilitated the items.
 Two vintage 1950s diesel switching locomotives, both in near-derelict condition. Originally slated for restoration, these units are currently for sale.

Other rolling stock includes three flat cars (two of which that have been modified for use as open air passenger cars), a British coach, a small parlour car matching the Dunrobin (originally used as the main car but retired due to interior damage), a Morrissey, Fernie & Michel Railway (MF&M) baggage/coach combo, a CP caboose, MF&M snow plows, and two tank cars used for fuel storage.

Notable people
William Astor Drayton (1888–1973), mining magnate, was an intermittent resident 1924–1944.

See also
Barkerville, British Columbia, a similar operation.
List of heritage railways in Canada
List of museums in Canada
Snow Queen, a fantasy film shot on site.

Footnotes

References

Ghost towns in British Columbia
Heritage railways in British Columbia
Canadian gold rushes
British Columbia gold rushes
Populated places in the Regional District of East Kootenay
Populated places established in 1864
Heritage sites in British Columbia
National Historic Sites in British Columbia
Museums in British Columbia
Open-air museums in Canada